The Play-offs of the 2011 Fed Cup Asia/Oceania Zone Group I were the final stages of the Group I Zonal Competition involving teams from Asia and Oceania. Using the positions determined in their pools, the seven teams faced off to determine their placing in the 2011 Fed Cup Asia/Oceania Zone Group I. The top team advanced to the World Group II, and the bottom team was relegated down to the Group II for the next year.

Promotional Round
The first placed teams of each pool played in a head-to-head round. The winner advanced to the World Group II play-offs, where they'd get a chance to advance to World Group II.

Uzbekistan vs. Japan

3rd to 4th play-off
The second placed teams of each pool played in a head-to-head round to find the third and fourth placed teams.

Thailand vs. Kazakhstan

5th to 6th play-off
The third placed teams of each pool played in a head-to-head round to find the fifth and sixth placed teams.

China vs. South Korea

Relegation play-off
The last placed teams of each pool played in a head-to-head round. The loser of was relegated down to Asia/Oceania Zone Group II in 2012.

India vs. Chinese Taipei

Final Placements

  advanced to the World Group II play-offs, where they were drawn against . They won 4-0, and as such were promoted to the World Group II.
  were relegated down to Group II for 2012, where they placed first in their pool and won their promotional play-off. They thus advanced back to Group I for 2013.

See also
Fed Cup structure

References

External links
 Fed Cup website

2011 Fed Cup Asia/Oceania Zone